Rhopalum perforator is a wasp species in the family Crabronidae. It is endemic to New Zealand.

References

External links

Citizen science observations

Crabronidae
Hymenoptera of New Zealand
Insects described in 1876
Endemic fauna of New Zealand
Endemic insects of New Zealand